Begoña Vía Dufresne Pereña (born 13 February 1971) is a Spanish sailor and Olympic champion. She competed at the 1996 Summer Olympics in Atlanta, where she won gold medal in the 470 class, together with Theresa Zabell.

Her sister is Natalia Vía Dufresne.

Notes

References

External links
 
 
 

1971 births
Living people
Spanish female sailors (sport)
Sailors at the 1996 Summer Olympics – 470
Olympic sailors of Spain
Olympic gold medalists for Spain
Olympic medalists in sailing
470 class world champions
Medalists at the 1996 Summer Olympics
World champions in sailing for Spain